Acrodipsas mortoni, the brown ant-blue, is a butterfly of the family Lycaenidae. It is found in inland New South Wales and southern Queensland in Australia.

External links
Image
Australian Biological Resources Study

Acrodipsas
Butterflies of Australia
Butterflies described in 1997